Khompateh Arbu Sara (also Romanized as Khompateh Ārbū Sarā; also known as Khanpateh) is a village in Rahimabad Rural District, Rahimabad District, Rudsar County, Gilan Province, Iran. At the 2006 census, its population was 330, in 85 families.

References 

Populated places in Rudsar County